Bust a Move may refer to:

In music
 "Bust a Move" (song), a 1989 hip hop song by Young MC

In video games
 Bust-a-Move, a 1994 puzzle video game known as Puzzle Bobble outside of North America and Europe
 Bust a Move: Dance & Rhythm Action, original Japanese name for Bust a Groove

In television
 "Bust A Move Part 1", an episode of Degrassi: The Next Generation
 "Bust A Move Part 2", an episode of Degrassi: The Next Generation